Gustavo Corrêa da Silva (born 7 September 1997), known as Gustavo Silva or Gustavo Mosquito, is a Brazilian professional footballer who plays for Corinthians as a forward.

Club career
Born at Campo Largo, Paraná, Silva joined the youth setup of Coritiba at the age of nine. On 2 May 2016, his contract was extended until September 2018. In 2017 Campeonato Brasileiro Sub-20, he scored 9 goals and became the top scorer of the season.

Ahead of the 2018 season, Silva was promoted to the senior team. On 8 October 2018, he signed with Corinthians until 2022. On 20 January 2019, he made his professional debut, coming on as a substitute in a 1–1 draw against São Caetano, in Paulista A1.

Personal life
Upon joining Corinthians, Silva dropped his nickname "Mosquito". He said that he would like to be called as Gustavo or Gustavo Silva.

Career statistics

Honours
Corinthians
Campeonato Paulista: 2019

References

External links
Corinthians profile 

1997 births
Living people
Association football forwards
Brazilian footballers
Campeonato Brasileiro Série A players
Campeonato Brasileiro Série B players
Coritiba Foot Ball Club players
Sport Club Corinthians Paulista players
Vila Nova Futebol Clube players
Oeste Futebol Clube players
Paraná Clube players